The Ho-Am Prize was established in 1990 by Kun-Hee Lee, the Chairman of Samsung, with a vision to create a new corporate culture that continues the noble spirit of public service espoused by the late Chairman Byung-chull Lee, founder of Samsung. Awarded since 1991, it is funded by Samsung and named after their former chairman, Lee Byung-chul (Ho-Am is his pen name which means filling up a space with clear water as lakes do, and being unshakeable as a large rock). The Ho-Am Prize is currently awarded in five fields: Science, Engineering, Medicine, Arts and Community Service.  The Ho-Am Prize in the Arts was established in 1994.

Prizewinners of Ho-Am Prize in the Arts

See also
 Ho-Am Prize
 Ho-Am Prize in Science
 Ho-Am Prize in Engineering
 Ho-Am Prize in Medicine
 Ho-Am Prize in Community Service

References 

Arts awards in South Korea
Korean art
Awards established in 1994
Samsung
Annual events in South Korea
1994 establishments in South Korea